Slick is the ninth album by former Temptations vocalist Eddie Kendricks, released in August 1977 on the Tamla imprint of Motown Records. It reached No. 47 on the Billboard Soul Albums chart.

Track listing
"Something Shady (Is Going On)" (Leonard Caston Jr., Ronn Matlock)	5:07 	
"Baby" (Leonard Caston Jr., Terri McFaddin)	3:52 	
"I Want to Live My Life with You" (Diane Goosby, Leonard Caston Jr.)	3:42 	
"You Got It" (Leonard Caston Jr., Terri McFaddin)	3:25 	
"Intimate Friends" (Garry Glenn) 	5:49 	
"Diamond Girl" (Jim Seals, Dash Crofts)	4:25 	
"Then Came You" (Diane Goosby, Leonard Caston Jr.)	7:31 	
"I'll Have to Let You Go" (Kathy Wakefield, Leonard Caston Jr.)	4:34 	
"California Woman" (Kathy Wakefield, Leonard Caston Jr.)  3:31

Personnel
Eddie Kendricks - lead and backing vocals
Eddie Willis, Robert White - guitar
Lee Marcus, Quentin Dennard, Richard "Pistol" Allen, Uriel Jones - drums
Roderick Chandler - bass
George Roundtree, Leonard Caston Jr. - keyboards
Jack Brokensha - percussion
Gerry Paul - congas
Larry Nozero - alto saxophone
Barbara Dickerson, Carolyn Majors, Cheryl Lynn, Danny Smith, Donna Thedford, Jean Thompson, Patricia Smith, Phylis Cole, Theo Turner, Victor Caston - backing vocals
David Willardson - cover illustration

Charts

Singles

Samples
"Intimate Friends" has been sampled by multiple artists for various songs, including:
"Goin' In For Life" by Drake from Comeback Season.
"Light" by Big Sean from I Decided.
"Unbreakable" by Alicia Keys from Unplugged.
"Fall in Love (Your Funeral)" by Erykah Badu from New Amerykah Part Two (Return of the Ankh).
"Another Summer" by 213 from their The Hard Way album.
"Old Times Sake" by Sweet Sable from the soundtrack to Above the Rim.
"A Penny For My Thoughts" by Common from Can I Borrow a Dollar?.

References

External links
 Eddie Kendricks-Slick at Discogs.com

1977 albums
Eddie Kendricks albums
Tamla Records albums